Amante or Amantes may refer to:

People with the surname
Edelmiro Amante (1933–2013), Filipino politician
Ferdinand M. Amante, Jr. (born 1961), Filipino politician
Vicente Amante (born 1948), Filipino politician

Books
Los Amantes, 1968 play with Amelia Bence
Los Amantes, poetry collection by Arturo Corcuera 1976

Film and TV
Amantes (film), 1991 Spanish film noir written and directed by Vicente Aranda
Amantes (TV series), telenovela

Music
"El Amante", song by Nicky Jam
El Amante, 1981 album by Sunny & the Sunliners
Los Amantes (song), a 1988 song by Mecano

Art
 Los Amantes, a painting by René Magritte

Other
Amantes (tribe), an ancient tribe in modern southern Albania